Serixia thailandensis is a species of beetle in the family Cerambycidae. It was described by Villiers and Chujo in 1962.

References

Serixia
Beetles described in 1962